Candy Coated Fury is the eighth studio album by the American ska punk band Reel Big Fish, released on July 31, 2012. The cover art was made by artist Thom Foolery. The album was recorded at the band's personal studio in Orange, California.

The album features guest vocals from Coolie Ranx, Brian Klemm, Julie Stoyer, and members of Sonic Boom Six. Aaron Barrett said that when writing the album, he was "very conscious this time about how danceable the songs were and how they make you move when you listen to them. It had been a long time since I really thought about the danceability of our songs."

On June 6, 2012, the band released a teaser video for the album.
On June 12, 2012, the band released the song "I Know You Too Well To Like You Anymore" on their YouTube channel days after the song premiered on the Ska Parade radio show on KUKQ. The album was released July 31, 2012, and was sold in a limited quantity at several venues on the Summer of Ska Tour 2012. The album debuted at No. 80 on the Billboard 200.

Track listing

 Notes
 Originally performed by The Wonder Stuff
      Actually 2:44. Then hidden track "Oh, Rudy" (1:15) starts right after.
  Originally performed by When in Rome

Personnel 
Reel Big Fish
Aaron Barrett – guitar, lead vocals
Dan Regan – trombone, vocals
John Christianson – trumpet, vocals
Ryland Steen – drums, percussion, vocals
Derek Gibbs – bass guitar, vocals
Matt Appleton – harmony vocals, tenor saxophone, baritone saxophone, organ

Additional musicians
Coolie Ranx – vocals on "Hiding in My Headphones"
Julie Stoyer – vocals on "I Know You Too Well to Like You Anymore" and "Oh, Rudy
Laila Khan – vocals on "Hiding in My Headphones"
James SK Wān - vocals on "Hiding in My Headphones"
Barney Boom (Paul Barnes) – vocals on "Hiding in My Headphones"
Brian Klemm – vocals on "Your Girlfriend Sucks"

References

External links

Candy Coated Fury at YouTube (streamed copy where licensed)

2012 albums
Reel Big Fish albums
Rock Ridge Music albums